This is a list of gliders/sailplanes of the world, (this reference lists all gliders with references, where available) 
Note: Any aircraft can glide for a short time, but gliders are designed to glide for longer.

Hungarian miscellaneous constructors

Pre-war Hungarian Sportflying organisations and workshops 
 MAESZ – Magyar Aero Szövetség (Hungarian Aero Association)
 Esztergom Flying Society of MOVERO (Hungarian acronym for the Flying Section of Hungarian National Home Guard)
 MSrE – Mûegyetemi Sportrepülõ Egyesület (Sportfying Club of the Technical University of Budapest)
 Aero Ever Kft. 1938–1948
 HMNRA – Horthy Miklós Nemzeti Repülõ Alap (Horthy Miklós National Aviation Foundation)

Post war Hungarian Sportflying organisations and workshops 
 OMRE – Országos Magyar Repülö Egyesület (National Hungarian Flying Association) 1948–1951
 OMRE Központi Repülögépjavító Üzem, Budaörs – (Central Aircraft Repair Plant of the OMRE, Budaörs) 1948–1951
 OMRE Központi Repülögépjavító Üzem, Dunakeszi (Central Aircraft Repair Plant of the OMRE, Dunakeszi) 1948–1951
 OMRE Központi Javító Műhelyében
 MRSz – Magyar Repülö Szövetség (Hungarian Aeronautical Association) (took over OMRE in 1951)
 MRSz Központi Repülögépjavító Üzem, Mátyásföld (Central Aircraft Repair Plant of the MRSz, Mátyásföld) 1951–1955
 MRSz Központi Repülögépjavító Üzem, Dunakeszi (Central Aircraft Repair Plant of the MRSz, Dunakeszi) 1951–1955
 AKKÜ – Alagi Központi Kisérleti Üzem – (Central Experimental Plant, Alag). 1955–1958
 Sportárutermelõ Vállalat (Factory of Sport Appliances). 1948–1957
 EMESE Experimental Aircraft Factory
 Labor Mûszeripari Mûvek Esztergomi Gyáregysége (Subsidiary of the "Labor" Industrial Instrument Works), 1957–1958
 Pestvidéki Gépgyár Esztergomi Gyáregysége (Esztergom Facility of the Pest-Area Machine Factory), 1958–1969

Hungarian gliders 

 Adorján Libelle
 Cinke – Hungary – modified DFS Meise
 E-31 Esztergom – Esztergom Facility of Pest Area Machine Factory (PGE) (formerly Sportárutermelõ V., Esztergom)
 EV-1K Fecske – Esztergom Facility of Pest Area Machine Factory (PGE) (formerly Sportárutermelõ V., Esztergom)
 Gribovszkij G-9 Dzsunka – Gribovszki G-9 Dzsunka built under licence
 Gyõr-2 – Aeroclub of the Rolling-stock Factory, Gyõr
 Gyõr-3 Motor-Pilis – Aeroclub of the Rolling-stock Factory, Gyõr
 Horváth III
 Kemény K-02 Szellõ – Sándor Kemeny – MÁV Istvántelki Fõmûhely, Sportárutermelõ V. (former Aero Ever Ltd.), Esztergom
 Kesselyàk KM-400 – Kesselyak, Mihály – Workshop of the Airplane Service of the Hungarian Agricultural Ministry, Nyiregyháza
 Király-Berkovice I
 Kolbányi V
 Lampich LS-16 – Árpád Lampich
 Lányi Az Ket biplán
 Létai IV-Minár
 OMRE Bene – Hugó NAGY – OMRE – Országos Magyar Repülö Egyesület Központi Javító Műhelyében, Budapesten – Hungarian National Flying Association Budapest
 OMRE OE-01 – (aka Rubik R-20) – Papp, M. & Rubik, Ernõ – OMRE Központi Javító Műhelyében, Budapesten – Hungarian National Flying Association Budapest
 Pfitzner Amerik-Gép
 Prodam III Hadi
 Racek 3 Möwe
 R–03 Szittya I
 R–04 Szittya II
 R–10 Szittya III
 R–07a Tücsök
 R–07b Vöcsök
 R–08 Pilis
 R–11 Cimbora
 R–12 Kevély
 Rubik R-15 Koma
 Rubik R-16 Lepke
 R–17 Móka
 Rubik R–21 (military transport)
 R–22 Futár
 R–22S Június 18.
 R–23 Gébics
 R–24 Bibic
 R–25 Mokány
 R–253
 R-254 (E–31) Esztergom
 Rubik R-26 Góbé
 R–27 Kópé
 Rubik R-31 Dupla
 Suranyi-Hegedús I
 Svachulay Albatross
 Svachulay Szent György  
 SZ-10 Horak
 Székely Parasol
 Takács III
 Tóth Furnér-Gép
 Vándor – Zoltán JANKA – Lajos Rotter – MOVERO workshop, Gyöngyös
 Zsélyi 2

Notes

Further reading

External links

Lists of glider aircraft